Globus-1M #12L or No.12L ( meaning Globe-1M), also known as Raduga-1M 2 ( meaning Rainbow-1M) is a Russian military communications satellite which is operated by the Russian Space Forces. It was the second Raduga-1M satellite to be launched – the first being Globus-1M #11L which was launched in 2008, and forms part of the Raduga satellite system. It is positioned in geostationary orbit at a longitude of 70 degrees East.

Globus-1M #12L was built by JSC Information Satellite Systems, and is equipped with multiple transponders broadcasting centimetre-band and decimetre-band signals. It was launched by the Khrunichev State Research and Production Space Centre, using a Proton-M carrier rocket with a Briz-M upper stage. The launch occurred at 00:18:00 GMT on 28 January 2010, from Site 81/24 at the Baikonur Cosmodrome. The launch was successful, and inserted the satellite directly into geosynchronous orbit.

See also

2010 in spaceflight

References

Spacecraft launched in 2010
Satellites using the KAUR bus